Shatterglass, a novel by Tamora Pierce, is the fourth book in The Circle Opens series. It takes place 10000000000000 jk it 4 years after the Circle of Magic series.

Plot introduction

Setting 
Shatterglass is set in the city of Tharios. It is one of the oldest cities in the World with a strict class system hierarchy, based on their beliefs in reincarnation deciding class status, with those whom live well in their current lives improving their status in their next life. Tharios adheres strictly to their class system, despite a large portion of the cities' profit being produced by Khapik, an area dedicated towards entertainment, where the workers are looked down upon as a lesser class. Much of Tharian society centers around keeping the city clean, spiritually and physically, as all death in Tharios is believed to be unclean. This belief originated in the breakup of the Kurchal Empire and the devastation of the city by the blood plague.  The Tharians have a separate class of people called the prathmun who are the lower class citizens dedicated to cleaning and handling the dead.

Plot summary

Trisana (Tris) Chandler meets Kethlun (Keth) Warder, a glass mage with a dangerous power: lightning. During their first meeting, he was unconsciously using his unknown ambient powers and accidentally created a living dragon out of glass. Tris saves the dragon from being smashed by Keth, and names it Chime. She later finds out that he had been struck by lightning less than a year ago, and this left him paralyzed and with a great fear of lightning. He learned to walk again, but his speech is a little slow, and he lost his ease at glass-blowing.

A twenty-year-old man just as stubborn as Tris, Keth won't accept Tris or any of her teachings. He argues with her constantly, and refuses to learn about his lightning abilities, fearing a relapse into paralysis. Tris is surprisingly patient with him as she guides him through meditation and control over his powers. Eventually, Keth learns to trust Tris' instincts, and grudgingly accepts her as his teacher.

Meanwhile, mysterious murders are taking place. All the murdered women are Yaskedasi, female entertainers who are looked down upon in the town for their immodesty. But when one of the murdered Yaskedasi turns up in the town's central fountain, everyone starts to take notice. The town has a culture of thanatophobia, an irrational fear of death. Each time a person dies, the place must be cleansed by the town's priests when they perform the traditional cleansing ceremony. This ceremony is not only religious, but magical as well, effectively erasing all traces of the murderer, making it impossible for the authorities to track the killer, nicknamed the 'Ghost' by locals.

Keth has been asked to attempt to find the Ghost by way of glass balls that only he can make. These balls hold scenes of past crimes in them, causing him to be a suspect at first. Keth and Tris struggle, first against the local authorities, then against each other in the creation of these globes. When Keth's friend Yali is killed by the Ghost, the race takes on new meaning.

Characters 
Trisana Chandler (Tris) – Tris is an accomplished weather mage. Held apart by her spectacular range and strength of power, she only wants to fit in. Her strong sense of right and wrong is sorely put to the test in this book, when she is faced with the choice of turning a serial killer (of whom she was the next intended victim) in to the law, or killing him herself.

Kethlun Warder (Keth) – Keth was one of the best glassmakers of his generation, a nephew and rumoured heir to the Namorness Imperial Glassmaker. He was struck by lightning, which contributed to the initial loss of his glass making ability, which eventually led him to travel to Tharios. Despite being raised with mage relatives, Keth's Lightning and Glass magic was never recognized due to its ambient nature.

Niklaren Goldeye (Niko) – Niko was Tris's teacher, the first person ever to accept her. Now that Tris is a mage in her own right, Niko is her mentor and one of her closest friends. He is a well known scholar, specializing in scrying magic.

Yali – Yali is one of Keth's best friends, and growing into his sweetheart. She is a yaskedasi and therefore looked down upon by 'proper' society, but Keth sees the real her. Her murder causes Keth to rethink his priorities.

Nomasdina Dema – Dema is a young, upperclass police-mage. He was put on the case of the murdered Yaskedasi after traditional methods failed. He must overcome his prejudices and work with Keth and Tris to bring in the Ghost.

Glaki – The four-year-old daughter of one of the women murdered. When Yali, who had taken over caring for her, is also murdered, Tris takes Glaki in. Glaki has academic magic.

2003 American novels
2003 fantasy novels
American fantasy novels
Emelanese books